The Ada Lovelace Award is given in honor of the English mathematician and computer programmer, Ada Lovelace, by the Association for Women in Computing. Founded in 1981, as the Service Award, which was given to Thelma Estrin, it was named the Augusta Ada Lovelace Award, the following year.

The award is given to individuals who have excelled in either of two areas: outstanding scientific/technical achievement and/or extraordinary service to the computing community through accomplishments and contributions on behalf of women in computing.

Award winners

See also
 BCS Lovelace Medal

References

External links
 Ada Lovelace Awards web page

1981 in women's history
1981 establishments in the United States
Awards established in 1981
American science and technology awards